Torgeir Rugtvedt (born 8 August 1976) is a retired Norwegian footballer.

He hails from Kroken, Troms, and joined the local great team Tromsø IL in 1989. He was drafted into the senior team in 1990, but did not make his league debut until 1992. After a second game in 1993, he left the club for Strindheim IL. Strindheim's 1994 season ended in promotion, and Rugtvedt amassed another Tippeligaen season in 1995 with the club. Four seasons in Odd followed, with yet another first-tier spell in 1999. He finished his career in minnows Tollnes BK, continuing to reside in Skien. He had studied there, and also acquired a job as head of department in Holla og Lunde Sparebank.

He represented Norway as a youth international.

References

1972 births
Living people
Sportspeople from Tromsø
Sportspeople from Skien
Norwegian footballers
Tromsø IL players
Strindheim IL players
Odds BK players
Tollnes BK players
Eliteserien players
Norwegian First Division players
Norway youth international footballers
Norwegian bankers

Association football defenders